Paraguay cheese (Guaraní: kesú paraguai) is a cows' milk cheese from Paraguay. It gives the Paraguayan cuisine a high value in calories and proteins, especially in the salted dishes recipes, very characteristic of the country and an important part of its culture. 

It is a special type of cheese that is made from “curd” (a preparation that is made by mixing milk with rennet, part of the digestive tract of certain ruminant animals that secretes lactic acid during the digestion process), generally has salt and since it is made with whole milk, is very creamy and nutritious. It is soft and with some acid flavor, and can be preserved for about 45 days.

Origin of the name
The name “kesú paraguai” (Paraguay cheese) comes from the transformation of the words “cheese” (queso in Spanish) and “Paraguay” (Paraguay, as the country) into Guaraní.

The use of the word “paraguai” with an “I” instead of a “y” is because in Guaraní, the “y” is pronounced differently from the Spanish pronunciation and has another meaning, which is “water”.

Preparation
The ingredients used in the manufacture of “Paraguay cheese” are both dairy products: whole milk and curd.

The preparation consists of three processes: the treatment of the rennet, the making of the curd and finally the manufacture of the cheese itself.

The rennet  is opened and washed very thoroughly and put in a container with a large amount of sour orange or lemon juice. It is left there to soak in the liquid for about three to four hours and then put out to dry in the sun. When it is dry, the rennet is ready to curdle the milk.

For the curd, the full-fat milk is put inside a container, the rennet is added, then the mixture is stirred occasionally for about an hour. After that time, it is tested by dropping some of the liquid in the palm of the hand, if there are curds then the rennet is removed and the milk is left for a short while to finish the process.

Finally, the cheese is formed by breaking the curd, after which it is left again to settle for another few hours so it loses some liquid called whey. After this, the curd is squeezed until all the liquid is gone. When the curd has no more whey, it is put in specially made frames with rectangular shape called cheese-dishes. The next day the “kesú Paraguay” is ready to be consumed.

History
The elaboration of the “kesú paraguai” started in the country states (dedicated to the agriculture and cattle) of Paraguay.

According to some scholars of social history of Paraguay, all the Paraguayan popular gastronomy, which establishes itself as a small family industry after the Paraguayan War where Paraguay fought the Triple Alliance (Argentina, Brazil and Uruguay, between 1864 and 1870), is really abundant in caloric content, because of the situation that overcame to the country after the conflict. In the aftermath of the war, food was limited, groceries were hard to find. So Paraguayan cooking has a high protein content to make up for the scarcity of daily meals.

References 
 “Tembi’u Paraguay” de Josefina Velilla de Aquino
 “Karú rekó – Antropología culinaria paraguaya”, de Margarita Miró Ibars

External links
 Guarani Raity

Cow's-milk cheeses
Paraguayan cuisine